Ciudad de Brahman (in English, Brahman's City) is the second studio album by Argentine stoner rock band Los Natas, released in 1999 by Man's Ruin Records.

The album was recorded in January 1999 at the Louder Studios, in San Francisco, property of engineer Tim Green, and produced by the Melvins member Dale Crover.

It was later re-released in Germany by Elektrohasch Schallplatten, in Argentina by South American Sludge, and on the box set Bee Jesus, which compiles this album, along with Delmar and the El Gobernador EP.

Track listing 
 "Carl Sagan 1" - 3:41
 "Meteoro 2028" - 4:34
 "Tufi Meme" - 5:55
 "La ciudad de Brahman" - 4:54
 "Siluettle" - 2:14
 "Brisa del desierto" - 2:09
 "Paradise" - 4:12
 "Alohawaii" - 4:18
 "Adolescentes" - 4:25
 "999" - 1:58
 "Resplandor" - 3:01
 "Rutation" - 3:06
 "Polvareda" - 3:44
 "Nadha" - 3:00

Personnel 
 Guitar and Vocals: Sergio Chotsourian
 Drums: Walter Broide
 Bass Guitar: Miguel Fernandez
 Hawaiian Guitar & Piano: Dale Crover

Additional information
 Recorded in January 1999 at Louder Studios, San Francisco, California
 Mastered at Fantasy Studios, USA
 Produced by Dale Crover and Los Natas
 Artwork by Frank Kozik

References

1999 albums
Los Natas albums
Man's Ruin Records albums
Stoner rock albums